Katalin Korinthus (11 May 1953 – 25 October 2020) was a Hungarian teacher and politician who served as an MP.

Career
She graduated from Sárospatak Teacher Training College in 1975 as a lower school teacher and from Lajos Kossuth University in 1980 as a R&D pedagogue. From 1975 until 1980 she taught in No. 3 Primary School and from 1982 until 1992 in Ottó Herman Primary School in Miskolc respectively.

From 1975 until 1992 she was a member of labor unions of pedagogy. She was a member of MSZP from 1989. From 1990 until 1994 she was a councillor in Miskolc City Council. She ran for a seat in the National Assembly in 1990, 1994 and 1998. She had a seat in the National Assembly from constituency no. 3 of Borsod-Abaúj-Zemplén County during the Horn administration (1994-1998). She was a Member of the Committee for Culture and Press Affairs.

She was an active volunteer and member in numerous associations and foundations, including Roma-Hungarian Friendship Society.

Private life
She had been married twice. She married Attila Mihályi in 1973, who died in 1976. Their daughter, Helga, a sociologist, was born in 1975. Her first husband died in 1976.
She married assistant professor Péter Tóth in 1977, they had a daughter, Petra. This marriage ended in divorce in 1981.

She died from COVID-19 on 25 October 2020, in Hungary.

References

1953 births
2020 deaths
Hungarian educators
People from Miskolc
Deaths from the COVID-19 pandemic in Hungary
Hungarian Socialist Party politicians
20th-century Hungarian politicians
20th-century Hungarian women politicians
Members of the Hungarian Socialist Workers' Party
Members of the National Assembly of Hungary (1994–1998)